Echo Orbiter is a Philadelphia, Pennsylvania, based indie rock band founded by brothers Justin Emerle and Colin Emerle, described by Philadelphia Weekly as being "Widely considered two of the most inventive songwriters on the Philadelphia scene."

History

Early years
Echo Orbiter formed in 1996 in Westville, New Jersey when brothers Justin Emerle and Colin Emerle began performing with drummer Jeremiah Steffen.  Still in high school, the band entered Miner St. Studios in Philadelphia to record their first album, A Moment In Life That’s Right.  Engineered by Brian McTear, the album was “a consistent incorporation of pleasingly-textured pop tunes.” with what one writer called a resemblance to “Guided by Voices when they made albums that didn’t suck.”

Soon after the release of their first album, the appearance of the track “Spring is Here” on a compilation of Philadelphia’s newly emerging indie bands helped EO gain a spot at the Philadelphia PopFest in 1998 and 1999, and a headlining spot at the PopFest in 2000.  The band received widespread coverage after “group members pummeled a giant cardboard robot head, obliterated a couple of guitars and violently dismantled their drum kit,” while destroying the venue’s stage equipment in a “Who-like” manner at the 1999 PopFest.

The band re-entered Miner St./Cycle Sound Studios in 1999 and recorded their second album, Laughing All The While, which was again engineered by Brian McTear and partly co-engineered by Kurt Heasley of Lilys.  At this time, EO began to associate with the Elephant 6 Collective, appearing on compilations with of Montreal, often performing with Beulah, of Montreal, and the Minders, and releasing a split-45 with Calvin, Don't Jump!.

In 2001 the band was in Chapel Hill, North Carolina, touring with the Starlight Mints, when the September 11th attacks abruptly ended the tour.  Following the broken tour, along with the theft of their instruments, EO discontinued playing live shows altogether, last performing in Providence, Rhode Island, September 18, 2001 and not returning until nine years later to the day.

2001 to 2010
Although no longer performing live, brothers Justin and Colin continued to record prolifically.   During this period the band recorded music for Eventide Production’s short-film Mortality  and Get-Kinetic’s short-film 4.50   and appeared on over a dozen compilations by various record labels, including their “life affirming” cover of Medicine's “Never Click” on Never Lose That Feeling  released in the United Kingdom and Japan on Claire Records and on Club AC30 in the United States.

During this time EO also recorded 6 albums, 3 EP's, 5 singles, and 9 full-length compilation albums to accompany the albums and EP's, “clocking up 15 years at the coalface of indiedom” with a prolific "collection of superb three-minute pop bursts...."

2010–present
In 2010 Echo Orbiter released their ninth Studio album, Euphonicmontage.  The album’s experimental nature mixed a range of influences from writer Ayn Rand to The Flaming Lips.  The album was recorded to reflect the same Cubist style of Picasso’s paintings in music form and was described as “an innovative landmark in the world of indie rock.”  In 2010 EO also appeared on Sick of the Radio’s New Wave Moons: R. Stevie Moore Tribute  along with Ariel Pink and XTC’s Dave Gregory, and represented the United States on Indiecater Record's Fast Forward  compilation for the FIFA World Cup in South Africa.

Working along with Green Light Go Publicity to promote Euphonicmontage, Echo Orbiter played their first show in 9 years at Johnny Brenda’s in Philadelphia with Joe Jack Talcum of The Dead Milkmen on September 18, 2010, 9 years to the day of their last show, and were highlighted as a Cover Story in the Music Issue of the Philadelphia City Paper.  They followed up the year with More Batteries, an EP recorded entirely on a hacked iPhone.

In 2012, EO appeared along with artists including Sean Lennon, Matt Pond, Cornershop, Elf Power, and Ra Ra Riot in Rock Torch Volume One, a book of artists on artists, and released a free EP called Aerosol Power, which was recorded in a cabin in the Pocono Mountains in Pennsylvania during the winter of 2011 on a four-track reel-to-reel.

Discography

Albums
 A Moment In Life That’s Right (1998), LGW
 Laughing All The While (2000), LGW
 On A Deranged Holiday (2001), LGW
 Left Here Alone; Smiling (2002), LGW
 Qu’est-ce Pour Nous (2003), LGW
 Soundscapes, Vol. 1 (2004), LGW
 Orphan Kids Withdrawn Out Of This Comedy (2008), LGW
 Soundscapes, Vol. 2 (2009), LGW
 Euphonicmontage (2010), LGW

EPs 
 The Khyber Passed (2004), LGW
 The Time Of Ghosts And Clouds (2006), LGW
 The Lost Generation And The Golden Age Of Mysteries  (2007), LGW
 More Batteries (2011), LGW
 Aerosol Power (2012), LGW
 Luftwaffe Over London (2013), LGW

Singles 
 “Lost In The Light” (2001), (split 45 with Calvin, Don't Jump!) Perhaps Transparent Records
 “Sail The Cabin’s Creek” (2002), LGW
 “I Hope It’s Wonderful” (2002), LGW
 “Small Town America” (2003), LGW
 “I’m Ultracet” (2004), LGW
 “Who Does That Remind You Of?” (2008), LGW
 “Bicycle Superstar” (2010), LGW
 "What Scissors Sing In Their Halo Of Fog" (7" single) (2011), LGW

Compilation appearances
 “Spring Is Here” appears on Legion of Boom (1999), Ispy Records
 “Mrs. Walker’s Ice Cream” appears on Happy Happy Birthday To Me Vol. 2 (1999), Happy Happy Birthday To Me Records
 “I’m A Believer” (Monkees cover) appears on Through The Looking Glass: Indie Pop Plays The Music Of The Monkees (2000), Planting Seeds Records
 “Silence The Little Sparkle Girl” appears on The Winter Report; A Hype City Compilation (2001), Hype City Records
 “Christmas In Paris” appears on Christmas Underground (2001), Bumble Bear Records/Planting Seeds Records
 “August Landscape Green” appears on Dreaming Up The Perfect Pop (2002), Planting Seeds Records
 “Never Click” (Medicine cover) appears on Never Lose That Feeling, Volume 1 (2005), Claire Records (UK/Japan), Club AC30 (US)
 “Hurry Up Andy” appears on Winter Holidays with Little Pocket Records (2009), Little Pocket Records
 “Game Without A Name” appears on Fast Forward: An Indie Music Companion To South Africa 2010 (2010), Indiecater Records
 “I Hope That You Remember” (R. Stevie Moore cover) appears on New Wave Moons: R. Stevie Moore Tribute, Vol. 2 (2010), Sick Of The Radio

Short-film music
 “Golden Wash Of The Sunset” appears in the short-film Mortality (2000), Eventide Productions
 "Intelligentsia," "Elevator Radio," and "My Dear" appear in the short-film 4.50 (2003), Get-Kinetic Productions

Echo Orbiter full-length compilations
 The Delta Nine-Sound (2003), LGW
 Apathy Cuts Through The Silence (2003), LGW
 Aerial Laughter of Dreadful Magnificence (2004), LGW
 Bonne Pensee Du Matin (2005), LGW
 Oh Damned Night; You Again? (2006), LGW
 Everything Was Truth And Humor (2007), LGW
 Trashcan Funeral Service (2008), LGW
 The Smoke Endures Around All The Lights (2009), LGW
 The Three Penny Eggplant Symphony (2009), LGW
 Snowglobe Catastrophe (2011), LGW
 Placing the Secret to the Glass (2012), LGW
 We're Talking Negative Cool (2012), LGW

References

External links

Dream pop musical groups
Family musical groups
Indie rock musical groups from Pennsylvania
Musical groups established in 1996
Musical groups from Philadelphia
American shoegaze musical groups